Synchlora frondaria, the southern emerald, is a species of emerald moth in the family Geometridae. It is found in the Caribbean, Central America, North America, and South America.

The MONA or Hodges number for Synchlora frondaria is 7059.

Subspecies
These two subspecies belong to the species Synchlora frondaria:
 Synchlora frondaria avidaria Pearsall, 1917 c g
 Synchlora frondaria denticularia Walker, 1861 c g
Data sources: i = ITIS, c = Catalogue of Life, g = GBIF, b = Bugguide.net

References

Further reading

External links

 

Synchlorini
Moths described in 1858